Stef Wils (born 8 February 1982) is a Belgian professional football coach and a former centre back. He works as a youth coach with Antwerp.

Career
Wils started his career at the highest level of Belgian football with Lierse, where he remained 5 seasons. He then signed for Westerlo where he was supposed to replace Chris Janssens. Wils made his move to Gent during the winter transfer window of 2008–09, before returning to Westerlo in August 2011, signing a three-year contract. After the relegation of Westerlo in 2012, he moved to Cercle Brugge.

Honours 
 K.A.A. Gent
 Belgian Cup (1): 2009–10

External links
 

1982 births
Living people
Association football defenders
Association football midfielders
Belgian footballers
Belgian Pro League players
Nemzeti Bajnokság I players
Lierse S.K. players
K.V.C. Westerlo players
K.A.A. Gent players
Cercle Brugge K.S.V. players
Szombathelyi Haladás footballers
Belgian expatriate footballers
Expatriate footballers in Hungary
Belgian expatriate sportspeople in Hungary
Sportspeople from Turnhout
Footballers from Antwerp Province